DR503 is the debut studio album of The Dead C, released in 1988 by Flying Nun Records.

Track listing

Personnel 
Adapted from DR503 liner notes.

The Dead C
 Michael Morley – instruments
 Bruce Russell – instruments
 Robbie Yeats – instruments

Production and additional personnel
 Richard Steele – production, engineering
 Michael Stoodley – production, engineering

Release history

References

External links 
 

1988 debut albums
The Dead C albums
Flying Nun Records albums